Julia Beljajeva (born 21 July 1992) is an Estonian right-handed épée fencer.

Beljajeva is a two-time team European champion, 2017 team world champion, and 2013 individual world champion.

A two-time Olympian, Beljajeva is a 2021 team Olympic champion.

Beljajeva competed in the 2016 Rio de Janeiro Olympic Games and the 2020 Tokyo Olympic Games.

Career

Beljajeva took up fencing when she was ten years old at the suggestion of her aunt. Her first significant award was a bronze medal in the Nordic Cadet Championships, followed in 2008 by a silver medal, then a gold medal in 2009 in the Cadet European Championships.

In the senior category, she was a member of the Estonia team that won the bronze medal in women's team épée at 2012 European Championships in Legnano and the gold medal at the 2013 European Championships in Zagreb. Ranked 69th in the International Fencing Federation's rankings, she created an upset by defeating 15–14 world No. 1 Ana Maria Brânză in the quarter-finals of the 2013 World Fencing Championships. She then prevailed 14–13 world over No.5 Emese Szász and defeated 15–14 world No.4 Anna Sivkova to win the gold medal and Estonia's second world title in épée. She finished the 2012–13 season ranked 9th, a career best as of 2014.

In the 2013–14 season Beljajeva climbed her first World Cup with a silver medal in the Doha Grand Prix, followed by a quarter-finals placing in Barcelona. At the European Championships in Strasbourg, she lost in the second round to Switzerland's Tiffany Géroudet. In the team event, Estonia were defeated by Russia in the semi-finals, then by Italy and finished 4th. At the World Championships in Kazan she was overcome in the table of 16 by teammate Erika Kirpu, who eventually earned a bronze medal, and could not defend her title. In the team event, Estonia took their revenge against Italy in the semi-finals, prevailing 42–32, but lost to Russia in the final and ended up with a silver medal. Beljajeva finished the season No. 16.

Medal Record

Olympic Games

World Championship

European Championship

Grand Prix

World Cup

References

External links

  (archive)
 
 
 
 
 Julia Beljajeva at ESBL.ee  (in English)

1992 births
Living people
Sportspeople from Tartu
Estonian people of Russian descent
Estonian female épée fencers
Fencers at the 2015 European Games
European Games medalists in fencing
European Games silver medalists for Estonia
Olympic fencers of Estonia
Fencers at the 2016 Summer Olympics
Recipients of the Order of the White Star, 3rd Class
World Fencing Championships medalists
Fencers at the 2020 Summer Olympics
Olympic medalists in fencing
Medalists at the 2020 Summer Olympics
Olympic gold medalists for Estonia